Sioux is an unincorporated community located in the town of Bayview, Bayfield County, Wisconsin, United States.

This community was named after the Sioux people.

The Sioux Nation
The Sioux Nation consists of large tribes of Native Americans traditionally living in the Great Plains. The three major divisions of Sioux are: Lakota, Eastern Dakota, and Western Dakota. A large number of Sioux tribes were nomadic who moved from place to place following bison herds, and their lifestyle also revolved around hunting bison.

Notes

Unincorporated communities in Bayfield County, Wisconsin
Unincorporated communities in Wisconsin